The 1990–91 Drexel Dragons men's basketball team represented Drexel University  during the 1990–91 NCAA Division I men's basketball season. The Dragons, led by 14th year head coach Eddie Burke, played their home games at the Daskalakis Athletic Center and were members of the East Coast Conference (ECC).

The team finished the season 12–16, and finished in 3rd place in the ECC in the regular season.

Roster

Schedule

|-
!colspan=9 style="background:#F8B800; color:#002663;"| Regular season
|-

|-
!colspan=12 style="background:#FFC600; color:#07294D;"| ECC Tournament

Awards
Jonathan Rabb
ECC All-Conference First Team

Michael Thompson
ECC All-Conference First Team

Mike Wisler
ECC All-Rookie Team

References

Drexel Dragons men's basketball seasons
Drexel
1990 in sports in Pennsylvania
1991 in sports in Pennsylvania